The London, Midland and Scottish Railway (LMS) Fairburn Tank 2-6-4T is a class of steam locomotive. They were designed by Charles E. Fairburn for the LMS. 277 of these locomotives were built between 1945 and 1951, numbered in the range 42050–42186, (4)2187–(4)2299, (4)2673–(4)2699.

Overview 
This design was based on the earlier Stanier LMS Stanier 2-6-4T, which was derived from Henry Fowler's LMS Fowler 2-6-4T engine.

It was also the basis for the later British Railways Standard Class 4 tank. They were used mainly for suburban passenger trains. Forty-one examples of the class were constructed by Brighton railway works for service on the Southern Region of British Railways in 1950 and 1951, replacing earlier designs. Of these, seven were transferred to the North Eastern Region between Spring 1952 and the end of 1954; the other 34 were exchanged for a like number of London Midland Region BR Standard Class 4 2-6-4T locomotives at the end of 1959.

Accidents and incidents
On 19 April 1955, locomotive No. 42073 was in collision with V2 No. 60968 at  station, Northumberland. Both locomotives were derailed.

Withdrawal
The class was withdrawn between 1961 and 1967.

Preservation 
Two of the Brighton-built locomotives have survived in preservation.

In its early days, 2085 carried Caledonian Railway blue livery, complete with an oval brass Caledonian number plate. This attractive livery was popular with the public, but strongly divided opinions in the preservation movement for its inaccuracy. At the same time, 2073 was painted in LNWR blackberry black, which was comparably anachronistic but generated less hostility as it did at least resemble the original livery.

Models 
Bachmann produces a 00 Gauge model of the Fairburn 4MT in LMS Black as well as early and late BR, numbered as 42073.
Bachmann (Graham Farish) also produces several N gauge variants: 2691 in LMS black, 42096 (early BR black), and 42073 (late BR black).

ACE Trains have produced an O-gauge model of 2085 in its early-preservation Caledonian Railway blue livery, although the model is actually of a Stanier designed 2-6-4T.

Images

References

Sources

External links

4 Fairburn 2-6-4T
2-6-4T locomotives
Railway locomotives introduced in 1945
Standard gauge steam locomotives of Great Britain
Passenger locomotives